Roger Jürg Köppel (born 1965) is a Swiss politician, journalist, entrepreneur and publicist. He is currently a member of the Swiss People's Party (SVP). He also holds the position of publisher and editor-in-chief at the right-wing Swiss weekly magazine Die Weltwoche, a position that he has held since 2006. In the past he served as editor-in-chief of Die Welt from 2004 until 2006. Köppel joined the Swiss People's Party (SVP) in 2015 and contested the Swiss federal elections. He was elected as a member of the National Council and thereafter selected for the Foreign Affairs Committee.

Early life and education 
Köppel was born in Zürich. His mother was a secretary, while his father worked as a mason and a builder, and came to own a renovation company called Köppel AG. His mother was Protestant; his father, a Catholic. Both of Köppel's parents died during his teen years and he, along with his younger brother, who was ten at the time, and his girlfriend, moved in with his grandparents. He graduated from Kantonsschule Zürcher Unterland. He then studied in the University of Zurich's Department of Political Philosophy and Economic History. He completed his Licentiate in 1995. His thesis on Carl Schmitt, Autorität und Mythos: Carl Schmitt und die Wiederverzauberung staatlicher Gewalt (1916–1938) ("Authority and Myth: Carl Schmitt and the Re-enchantment of State Power") was written in collaboration with the Swiss philosopher Georg Köhler.

References 

1965 births
Living people
Politicians from Zürich
Swiss people of German descent
Swiss journalists
Swiss newspaper editors
Die Welt editors
University of Zurich alumni
Swiss People's Party politicians
Members of the National Council (Switzerland)
Carl Schmitt scholars